Vitry-en-Artois Airfield  is a regional airfield in France, located  northeast of Vitry-en-Artois;  north-northeast of Paris.  It supports general aviation with no commercial airline service scheduled.

It was built prior to World War II. Seized by the Germans in June 1940 during the Battle of France, it was used as a Luftwaffe military airfield during the occupation. Recaptured by the Allies in late 1944, it was used as an Allied military airfield until the end of the war.

History
Error : Confusion between Vitry-en-Artois (B-50, northern France) and Vitry-le-François (A-67, Champagne region).

German use during World War II
A small grass airfield prior to World War II, it was seized by the Germans in late May 1940. After its capture, Vitry-En-Artois was used by the Luftwaffe as a combat airfield during the Battle of France. As part of the Blitzkrieg, the Germans assigned the following units to the airfield during the battle, carrying out air attacks on the defending French and British Expeditionary Force:

 Jagdgeschwader 54  (JS 54) 28 May-6 June 1940  Messerschmitt Bf 109E
 Jagdgeschwader 51  (JS 51) 1–9 June 1940       Messerschmitt Bf 109E
 Lehrgeschwader 1   (LG 1) 14–25 June 1940      Junkers Ju 88A

After the Second Armistice at Compiègne on 22 June, the Luftwaffe moved Kampfgeschwader 53 (KG 53) to the airfield on 12 July. KG 53 was a Heinkel He 111 medium bomber unit that participated in the ensuing Battle of Britain, remaining assigned to Vitry until 18 June 1941.

Later in 1941, the Germans improved the facility into a permanent Luftwaffe airfield by expanding the support area with numerous maintenance shops, hangars, and laying down two 1500m concrete all-weather runways, aligned 03/21 and 09/27 (A possible third runway, aligned 13/31 is visible in aerial photography, only part of the 13 (northwest) end still remains). Numerous taxiways and dispersal aircraft parking areas were also constructed.  As Vitry is located in the Pas-de-Calais, it was believed by the Germans that when the Americans and British tried to land in France to open a Second Front, the airfield would have a key role in the defence of France.

In 1943, Vitry-En-Artois became a day interceptor airfield which housed fighters to attack the USAAF Eighth Air Force heavy bomber fleets attacking targets in Occupied Europe and Germany. Known units assigned (all from Luftflotte 3, Fliegerkorps IV):

 Jagdgeschwader 2   (JS 2) August–December 1943  Focke-Wulf Fw 190A
 Kampfgeschwader 2  (KG 2) 22 January-6 February 1944  Messerschmitt Me 410A/U
 Jagdgeschwader 26  (JS 26) 21–29 August 1944 Focke-Wulf Fw 190A

Largely due to its use as a base for interceptors, and also as part of Operation Quicksilver, which was designed to deceive the Germans about where the invasion of France would take place, Vitry-En-Artois was attacked several times by Eighth Air Force B-17 Flying Fortress heavy bomber groups in 1943 and 1944.

Allied use
Vitry-En-Artois was cleared of German forces in late August 1944 by elements of the First Canadian Army. Before withdrawing, what was not destroyed at the airfield by Allied bombing, hangars, buildings, electrical generators, water treatment and other facilities were blown up by German combat engineers. The IX Engineer Command 850th Engineer Aviation Battalion moved in about 7 September and attempted to perform a rehabilitation of the base so it could be used by Allied aircraft. However the destruction of the airfield was so complete that little could be salvaged, and the engineers laid down a 5000' Pierced Steel Planking (PSP) temporary runway over one of the destroyed German concrete runways aligned roughly east–west (09/27). Once declared operational on 15 September, the airfield was designated as Advanced Landing Ground "B-50 Vitry Airfield".

Once the PSP runway was laid down, tents were used for billeting and also for support facilities; a dump for supplies, ammunition, and gasoline drums was built along with a drinkable water well being drilled and a minimal electrical grid for communications and station lighting to replace the destroyed infrastructure of the Luftwaffe base.

Once operational, The USAAF Ninth Air Force used the base for several units from 15 September 1944 until closing the base on 18 December 1945.  Known units assigned were:

 358th Fighter Group, 14 September-16 October 1944 (P-47)
 573d Bombardment Squadron (391st Bombardment Group), 27 May-27 July 1945 (A-26)
 572d Bombardment Squadron (391st Bombardment Group), 5 June-27 July 1945  (A-26)
 574th Bombardment Squadron (391st Bombardment Group), 5 June-31 July 1945  (A-26)
 575th Bombardment Squadron (391st Bombardment Group), 1 June-31 July 1945  (A-26)

Vitry was also used by RAF well known units and used again as a marshalling and assembly area for transport units for elements of the First Allied Airborne Army during Operation Varsity in March 1945.

 No. 184 Squadron RAF, 4–15 September 1944 (Hawker Typhoon IB)
 No. 226 Squadron RAF "Sussex Missions" (137th Wing), 17 October 1944 – 22 April 1945 (Mitchell II)
 No. 88 Squadron RAF (137th Wing), 17 October 1944 – 6 April 1945 (Douglas Boston III & IV)
 No. 107 Squadron RAF (137th Wing), 17 October 1944 – 19 November 1944 (Douglas Boston III & IV)
 No. 342 Squadron RAF "FAFL Groupe Lorraine" (137th Wing), 17 October 1944 – 22 April 1945 (Douglas Boston III & IV, Mitchell II)

With the war ended, it was also used as a storage area for surplus allied (mostly American) aircraft after the war by Air Technical Service Command.
Vitry-En-Artois was returned to French control on 18 December 1945.

Postwar
In French control after the war, the airfield sat abandoned for years. There was much unexploded ordnance at the site which needed to be removed, as well as the wreckage of German and Allied aircraft. All of the buildings at the base were destroyed by the Allied air attacks or demolition, and although some had been repaired by the American combat engineers, most were in ruins. The French Air Force wanted nothing to do with a Nazi airfield on French soil, and as a result, the Air Ministry leased the land, concrete runways, structures and all, out to farmers for agricultural use, sending in unexploded ordnance teams to remove the dangerous munitions.

Eventually the facility was cleared of all the rubble and ruins of the German airfield. Concrete taxiways, parking ramps and dispersal pads were removed and turned into hardcore aggregate, eventually clearing the land which was leased to farmers for agricultural fields.

The current airfield was built south of the wartime airfield, along the D950. It has no connection to the wartime field. Relics of both wartime runways still exist, and single-lane agricultural roads are the remains of some of the former taxiways. The runways are still littered with bomb craters, now grown in by soil and grass and other vegetation.

See also

 Advanced Landing Ground

References

External links

Airports in Hauts-de-France
World War II airfields in France
Airfields of the United States Army Air Forces in France